The American crow (Corvus brachyrhynchos) is a large passerine bird species of the family Corvidae. It is a common bird found throughout much of North America. American crows are the New World counterpart to the carrion crow of Europe and the hooded crow of Eurasia; they all occupy the same ecological niche. Although the American crow and the hooded crow are very similar in size, structure and behavior, their calls and visual appearance are different.

From beak to tail, an American crow measures , almost half of which is tail. Plumage is all black, with iridescent feathers. It looks much like other all-black corvids. They are very intelligent, and adaptable to human environments. They can be distinguished from the common raven (C. corax) because American crows are smaller and the beak is slightly less pronounced; from the fish crow (C. ossifragus) because American crows do not hunch and fluff their throat feathers when they call; and from the carrion crow (C. corone) by size, as the carrion crow is larger and of a stockier build.

American crows are common, widespread, and susceptible to the West Nile virus, making them useful as a bioindicator to track the virus's spread. Direct transmission of the virus from crows to humans is impossible. They are considered an agricultural pest, and are subject to hunting and management.

Taxonomy and systematics
The American crow was described by German ornithologist Christian Ludwig Brehm in 1822.

A 2012 genetic analysis of the genus Corvus by Knud A Jønsson and colleagues using nuclear and mitochondrial DNA calculated that the American crow diverged from a lineage that gave rise to the collared, carrion and hooded crows around 5 million years ago.

"American crow" has been designated the official name by the International Ornithologists' Union (IOC).

Subspecies

The number of subspecies varies by authority, ranging between three and five. The unclear taxonomy of the northwestern crow, previously its own species, has complicated subspecies determinations. Subspecies differ in bill proportion and form a rough NE–SW clinal in size across North America. Birds are smallest in the far west and on the southern coast.
C. b. brachyrhynchos (Brehm, 1822) – eastern crow: northeastern United States, eastern Canada and surroundings. The nominate subspecies, and largest.
C. b. hesperis (Ridgway, 1887) – western crow: western North America except the Arctic north, the Pacific Northwest and the extreme south. Smaller overall with a proportionally more slender bill and low-pitched voice.
C. b. caurinus (Baird, 1858) – northwestern crow: of the Pacific temperate rain forests was formerly considered a distinct species as C. caurinus, averaging smaller in size than other American crows with a distinctly hoarser call. It forms a hybrid swarm with American crow (sensu stricto) in coastal Washington and British Columbia. The American Ornithological Society lumped the northwestern crow with the American crow in 2020. It is now considered a geographic variation within C. b. hesperis.
C. b. pascuus (Coues, 1899) – Florida crow: Florida. Mid-sized, short-winged, but decidedly long bill and legs.
C. b. paulus (Howell, 1913) – southern crow: southern United States. Smaller overall, bill also small.

Description

The American crow is a large, distinctive bird with iridescent black feathers all over. Its legs, feet and bill are also black. They measure  in length, of which the tail makes up about 40%. Males tend to be larger than females.

The most usual call is a loud, short, and rapid . Usually, the birds thrust their heads up and down as they utter this call. American crows can also produce a wide variety of sounds and sometimes mimic noises made by other animals, including other birds such as barred owls.

Visual differentiation from the fish crow (C. ossifragus) is extremely difficult and often inaccurate. Nonetheless, differences apart from size do exist. Fish crows tend to have more slender bills and feet. There may also be a small sharp hook at the end of the fish crow's upper bill. Fish crows also appear as if they have shorter legs when walking. More dramatically, when calling, fish crows tend to hunch and fluff their throat feathers.

If seen flying at a distance from where size estimates are unreliable, the distinctly larger common ravens (C. corax) can be distinguished by their almost lozenge-shaped tail and their larger-looking heads. They also fluff their throat feathers when calling — like fish crows, only more so. Ravens also soar for extended periods, unlike crows, which rarely fly more than a few seconds without flapping their wings.

Crows have been noted to be intelligent. They have the same brain-weight-to-body ratio as humans. This has led to some studies that have identified that crows are self-aware and that young crows take time to learn from tolerant parents. While a human has a neocortex, the crow has a different area in their brain that is equally complex.

The average lifespan of the American crow in the wild is 7–8 years. Captive birds are known to have lived up to 30 years.

Distribution and habitat
The range of the American crow now extends from the Pacific Ocean to the Atlantic Ocean in Canada, on the French islands of Saint-Pierre and Miquelon, south through the United States, and into northern Mexico. The increase in trees throughout the Great Plains during the past century due to fire suppression and tree planting facilitated range expansions of the American crow as well as range expansions of many other species of birds. Virtually all types of country from wilderness, farmland, parks, open woodland to towns and major cities are inhabited; it is absent only from tundra habitat, where it is replaced by the common raven. This crow is a permanent resident in most of the US, but most Canadian birds migrate some distances southward in winter. Outside of the nesting season these birds often gather in large (thousands or even millions) communal roosts at night.

The American crow was recorded in Bermuda from 1876 onwards.

Behavior and ecology
Studying the behavior of American crows is laborious due to the difficulty in catching them to band them, let alone catching them again. Thus much of their behavior, including daily routine, migration, molting, survivorship, age of first breeding, nestling development, nature of nesting helpers, and more remains poorly studied.

Diet

The American crow is omnivorous. It will feed on invertebrates of all types, carrion, scraps of human food, fruits, nuts such as walnuts and almonds, seeds, eggs and nestlings, stranded fish on the shore and various grains. American crows are active hunters and will prey on mice, young rabbits, frogs, and other small animals. In the winter and autumn, the diet of American crows is more dependent on nuts and acorns. Occasionally, they will visit bird feeders. The American crow is one of only a few species of bird that has been observed modifying and using tools to obtain food.

Like most crows, they will scavenge at landfills, scattering garbage in the process. Where available, corn, wheat and other crops are a favorite food. These habits have historically caused the American crow to be considered a nuisance. However, it is suspected that the harm to crops is offset by the service the American crow provides by eating insect pests.

Reproduction

American crows are socially monogamous cooperative breeding birds. Mated pairs form large families of up to 15 individuals from several breeding seasons that remain together for many years. Offspring from a previous nesting season will usually remain with the family to assist in rearing new nestlings. American crows do not reach breeding age for at least two years. Most do not leave the nest to breed for four to five years.

The nesting season starts early, with some birds incubating eggs by early April. American crows build bulky stick nests, nearly always in trees but sometimes also in large bushes and, very rarely, on the ground. They will nest in a wide variety of trees, including large conifers, although oaks are most often used. Three to six eggs are laid and incubated for 18 days. The young are usually fledged by about 36 days after hatching. Predation primarily occurs at the nest site and eggs and nestlings are frequently eaten by snakes, raccoons, ravens and domestic cats. Adults are less frequently predated, but face potential attack from great horned owls, red-tailed hawks, peregrine falcons and eagles. They may be attacked by predators such as coyotes or bobcats at carrion when incautious, although this is even rarer.

West Nile virus
American crows succumb easily to West Nile virus infection. This was originally a mosquito-borne African virus causing encephalitis in humans and livestock since about 1000 AD, and was accidentally introduced to North America in 1999, apparently by an infected air traveller who got bitten by a mosquito after arrival. It is estimated that the American crow population has dropped by up to 45% since 1999. Despite this decline, the crow is considered a species of least concern.
The disease runs most rampant in the subtropical conditions which encourage reproduction of its mosquito vectors among which Culex tarsalis is most significant. Mortality rates appear to be higher than those in other birds, causing local population losses of up to 72% in a single season. Because of this, American crows are a sentinel species indicating the presence of West Nile virus in an area. Crows cannot transmit the virus to humans directly.

Intelligence 
American crows, like other corvids, are highly cunning and inquisitive. They are able to steal food from other species, often in creative ways. One example shows a group of crows stealing a fish from a Northern river otter: one bird pecked the otter's tail to distract it while other birds swooped in and stole the fish. They are able to use and modify tools.

Relationship with humans 
Crows are a motif in human culture, often associated with death, thieves, graveyards, bad luck, and other negative connotations.

Reversely, they are seen by some neo-pagan and indigenous cultures as signs of luck, or even signs of certain gods, such as Apollo, Odin, and others.

Status and management
The intelligence and adaptability of the American crow has insulated it from threats, and it is instead considered an agricultural pest. In 2012, BirdLife International estimated the American crow population to be around 31 million. The large population and vast range result in the least concern status for the American crow, meaning that the species is not threatened with extinction.

Crows have been killed in large numbers by humans, both for recreation and as part of organized campaigns of extermination. In Canada, American crows have no protections, aside from Quebec which bans their hunting during the nesting season. Laws on their hunting vary throughout the United States. New Jersey allows for a limited hunting season, unless if they are agricultural pests in which case they may be killed. Oklahoma allows hunting even during the nesting season. In the first half of the 20th century, state sponsored campaigns dynamited roosting areas, taking large numbers of crows. A campaign in Oklahoma from 1934 to 1945 dynamited 3.8 million birds. The effect on populations was negligible and damage to agricultural crops did not decrease, and thus the campaign was halted as ineffective. In a study taking data from 1917 to 1999, intentional killings were the overwhelming cause of death for crows, accounting for 68% of all recovered bird bands.

Non-deadly methods of managing crows are varied but usually limited in their effectiveness. High value crops may be netted, but this is cost prohibitive for most other crops. Frightening may be used to disperse crows, including loud noises from guns, fake hawks flown from balloons, fake owls that move with the wind, strips of reflective tape on fences, or recordings of crow distress calls. Poisoned baits are of limited effectiveness, as only the most toxic baits work, and those are generally unacceptable for use. Crows quickly learn to avoid the less-toxic baits, as the baits make crows sick. The actual effect of crows on agriculture has been poorly studied. There is some suggestion that they may be a benefit to farmers, by eating insect pests and chasing off livestock predators like hawks.

References

Bibliography
 Goodwin, Derek & Gillmor, Robert (1976): Crows of the World (1st ed.). University of Washington Press, Seattle.

External links

 Skull of American Crow
 Pictures of American Crow on Birds of the World at Flickr
 
 
 American Crow call
 
 Northwestern Crow call (two birds)

Corvus
Birds of North America
Birds of the United States
Tool-using animals
Birds described in 1822
Taxa named by Christian Ludwig Brehm
Articles containing video clips